UNT Dallas station is a DART Light Rail in Dallas, Texas. It was constructed as part of the Southern Oak Cliff extension, and opened on October 24, 2016 along with the Camp Wisdom station. DART has hoped that this extension will help spur development south of Ledbetter along the new corridor to UNT Dallas. Bus access, kiss & ride access, general parking, and handicap parking will be provided at both stations of this new extension.

History
Ground was broken for the South Oak Cliff extension, including this station, on October 6, 2014.

References

External links
 - DART South Oak Cliff Extension page

Dallas Area Rapid Transit light rail stations in Dallas
Railway stations in the United States opened in 2016
Railway stations in Dallas County, Texas
Railway stations in Texas at university and college campuses